Irati Martín Rodríguez (born 6 July 2003) is a Spanish footballer who plays as a forward for Eibar.

Club career
Martín started her career at Landako school, then she went to Ezkurdi.

References

External links
Profile at La Liga

2003 births
Living people
Women's association football forwards
Spanish women's footballers
People from Durango, Biscay
Sportspeople from Biscay
Footballers from the Basque Country (autonomous community)
SD Eibar Femenino players
Primera División (women) players
Segunda Federación (women) players
Primera Federación (women) players